The 2013 Premier League season was the second division of British speedway.

Summary
The season took place between March and October 2013. The Scunthorpe Scorpions were the defending champions after winning in 2012. After finishing as runners-up the previous season, the Somerset Rebels went one better in 2013 and ended up being declared the Premier League Champions.

League table

Home: 3W = Home win by 7 points or more; 2W = Home win by between 1 and 6 points 
Away: 4W = Away win by 7 points or more; 3W = Away win by between 1 and 6 points; 1L = Away loss by 6 points or less
M = Meetings; D = Draws; L = Losses; F = Race points for; A = Race points against; +/- = Race points difference; Pts = Total Points

Play Offs
Group 1

Group 2

Play Off final
First leg

Second leg

Somerset were declared League Champions, winning on aggregate 92–89.

Premier League Knockout Cup
The 2013 Premier League Knockout Cup was the 46th edition of the Knockout Cup for tier two teams. Somerset Rebels were the winners of the competition.

First round

Quarter-finals

Semi-finals

Final
First leg

Second leg

Somerset were declared Knockout Cup Champions, winning on aggregate 103–77.

Final Leading averages

Riders & final averages
Berwick

 7.37
 7.21
 7.16
 6.43
 6.34
 5.94
 5.00
 4.22
 4.05

Edinburgh

 10.83
 7.59
 7.33
 7.30
 6.27
 6.19
 3.63
 2.79
 2.09

Glasgow

 8.39
 7.50
 6.82
 6.11
 5.83
 4.74
 4.47
 4.06
 3.77
 3.02

Ipswich

 8.93
 8.26
 7.64
 7.50
 7.46
 5.29
 4.82
 0.89

Leicester

 8.77
 8.46
 8.15
 7.59
 5.82
 5.33
 4.73
 4.34
 3.45
 2.53

Newcastle

 8.94 
 8.35
 8.11
 8.01
 7.67
 7.55
 7.28
 5.31
 3.24

Plymouth

 9.02
 7.80
 7.28
 7.16
 6.56
 5.82
 4.70
 4.57
 4.30
 3.94

Redcar

 8.29
 7.87
 7.29
 6.53
 6.06
 5.03
 4.26
 3.50
 3.16

Rye House

 8.55
 8.12
 7.77
 7.52
 7.17
 6.60
 5.25
 4.91
 3.08

Scunthorpe

 8.42
 7.72
 7.43
 6.93
 6.72
 5.66
 5.34
 5.01

Sheffield

 9.16
 8.45
 6.97
 5.66
 5.35
 4.71
 4.13
 2.94
 2.40

Somerset

 10.23
 9.18
 8.70 
 7.67
 6.68
 5.58
 5.47
 3.67
 3.64
 2.71

Workington

 8.84 
 8.45
 7.40
 7.08
 6.67
 4.94
 3.83

See also
List of United Kingdom Speedway League Champions
Knockout Cup (speedway)

References

Speedway Premier League
Premier
Speedway Premier League